Scoparia apachealis is a moth in the family Crambidae. It was described by Eugene G. Munroe in 1972. It is found in North America, where it has been recorded from Arizona, New Mexico and Utah.

Subspecies
Scoparia apachealis apachealis (Arizona)
Scoparia apachealis pinalensis Munroe, 1972 (Arizona)
Scoparia apachealis utalis Munroe, 1972 (Utah)

References

Moths described in 1972
Scorparia